Artio Films is an Icelandic film production company founded in 2006 by Jon Gustafsson. Artio Films produces documentaries, feature films, short films and commercials. Artio Films has produced commercial projects for Icelandic companies, Animal Planet, CBC Television, Reuters and Associated Press.

Films
Among the films produced by Artio Films are Wrath of Gods, an award-winning documentary featuring Gerard Butler, Tony Curran, Rory McCann and Sturla Gunnarsson, and the award-winning short film "In A Heartbeat".

References

External links

Film studios
Film production companies of Iceland
Film distributors
2006 establishments in Iceland
Mass media companies established in 2006
Mass media in Reykjavík